Adelândia is a municipality in eastern Goiás state, Brazil.

Location
The distance to the state capital Goiânia is 129 km. while the distance to the regional center São Luís de Montes Belos is 6 km.
Highway connections are made by state highway BR-069 west from Goiânia, through Trindade, São Luís de Montes Belos, and then 6 kilometers to Adelândia.  Neighboring municipalities are Mossâmedes, Anicuns, Turvânia, São Luís de Montes Belos, and  Sanclerlândia.

Political Information
The number of registered voters was 1971 (09/06/2004) while the mayor was Mauricio Martins de Freitas), vice-mayor (Adma Duarte Gomes e Silva), and there were 09 council members.

The ex-mayor Lourival de Assis Lobo (1951-2007) was the first independent mayor of the city and the emancipator. His first lady was D. Luciene Rocha Malheiros Lobo. 

He had nine descendants in his lineage: Fabio Lobo, Renata Lobo, Patricia Lobo, Elmo Lobo, Lourival Filho, Raphael Lobo and Yuri Lobo.

The economy
The economy is based on cattle raising and growing of corn, bananas, and beans.  There is also some wood extraction and transformation.
The size of the cattle herd was 12,331 head.

Health and education
The infant mortality rate in 2000 was 24.88.  There was 1 small hospital in 2002 with 22 beds, 4 doctors and 2 nurses.  In the educational sector
there were 2 primary schools with 527 students (2004) and 1 middle school (State College Francisco de Assis Lobo Sobrinho) with 143 students.  The literacy rate in 2000 was 80.9%.  
(Source: IBGE)

Adelândia had a score of 0.715 on the Municipal Human Development Index, giving it a state ranking of 184 (out of 242 municipalities)
and a national ranking of 2,712 (out of 5,507 municipalities).  (All data are from 2000)

See also
List of municipalities in Goiás
Microregions in Goiás

References

Frigoletto

Municipalities in Goiás